Shirvata Dam, is a gravity dam on Indrayani river near Maval, Pune district in State of Maharashtra in India.

Specifications

Purpose
 Hydroelectricity

See also
 Dams in Maharashtra
 List of reservoirs and dams in India

References

Dams in Pune district
Dams completed in 1920
1920 establishments in India
20th-century architecture in India